National Foundation for Women Legislators (NFWL) is a 501(c)(3) tax-exempt foundation established by the National Order of Women Legislators (NOWL) in the USA. Headquartered in Alexandria, Virginia, it assists women legislators with public opinion and legislative issues.

Organization
Through annual educational and networking events, the National Foundation for Women Legislators supports elected women from all levels of governance. As a non-profit, non-partisan organization, NFWL does not take ideological positions on public policy issues, but rather serves as a forum for women legislators to be empowered through information and experience.

See also
The NFWL Annual Conference is a national forum designed to encourage the building of alliances among elected women, industry leaders, and issue experts. The Conference fosters a safe environment for sharing ideas, discussing current events, and learning about new initiatives and programs through plenary sessions, workshops, roundtables and policy committees. The goal of the Annual Conference is to intellectually equip elected women to mold public opinion and prepare for legislative debate. Presentations throughout the Conference offer elected women new perspectives and innovative ideas that may inevitably lead to policy resolutions and legislation in their respective states. As a non-partisan organization, NFWL does not take ideological positions on any current issue, but rather exists to assist women leaders in the process of issue education, networking, re-elections, and leadership.

NFWL's Annual Conference is unique because a majority of the elected women who attend the Conference are given scholarships to support their presence. As a result, NFWL garners high attendance rates at all Conference events. This allows NFWL's supporters to have direct access to elected women from across the country in a variety of settings.

References

External links

 https://www.womenlegislators.org/about/board/

National Order of Women Legislators Records, 1933-1988 Sophia Smith Collection, Smith College

American women in politics
Non-profit organizations based in Washington, D.C.